Guo Longchen (born 12 January 1968) is a Chinese former cyclist. He competed in the team time trial at the 1988 Summer Olympics.

References

External links
 

1968 births
Living people
Chinese male cyclists
Olympic cyclists of China
Cyclists at the 1988 Summer Olympics
Place of birth missing (living people)
Asian Games medalists in cycling
Cyclists at the 1986 Asian Games
Cyclists at the 1990 Asian Games
Cyclists at the 1994 Asian Games
Medalists at the 1986 Asian Games
Medalists at the 1990 Asian Games
Medalists at the 1994 Asian Games
Asian Games gold medalists for China
Asian Games silver medalists for China
Asian Games bronze medalists for China
20th-century Chinese people